Mastana may refer to:
 Mastana (1954 film), a 1954 Hindi Bollywood Indian film
 Mastana (1970 film), a 1970 Hindi Bollywood Indian film 
 Murtaza Hassan (c. 1955–2011), commonly known as Mastana, Pakistani comedian